The Ghost Ship warehouse fire was a fire that occurred  in a former warehouse in the Fruitvale neighborhood of Oakland, California, that had been converted into an artist collective with living spaces. The fire occurred on December 2, 2016, at approximately 11:20 p.m. PST. At the time, the warehouse was hosting a concert featuring artists from the house music record label 100% Silk. The warehouse was only zoned for industrial purposes and residential and entertainment uses were illegal.

Of the 80 to 100 people attending the concert, 36 were killed, making it the deadliest fire in the history of Oakland. It was also the deadliest building fire in the United States since The Station nightclub fire in 2003, the deadliest in California since the 1906 San Francisco earthquake and the deadliest mass-casualty event in Oakland since the 1989 Loma Prieta earthquake.

The Alameda County District Attorney's office launched an investigation into the fire's causes, and in 2017 charged Ghost Ship's master tenant Derick Almena and his assistant Max Harris with felony involuntary manslaughter. In 2018, both pleaded no contest to thirty-six counts of involuntary manslaughter in a plea bargain with prosecutors, but the judge overseeing the case discarded the plea deals and the pair were put on trial, facing up to 36 years in prison. On September 4, 2019, the jury deadlocked 10-2 for conviction on the 36 counts manslaughter charges against Almena, resulting in a mistrial, while Harris was acquitted on all 36 counts. In 2021, Almena pled guilty to the 36 counts of manslaughter and was sentenced to 12 years in prison and released on time served.

In July 2020, the City of Oakland settled a civil lawsuit for the victims and agreed to pay a total of $33 million; $9 million to one person who survived with lifelong injuries, and $24 million to the families of the 36 who perished in the fire. In August 2020, Pacific Gas and Electric Company settled a civil lawsuit for 32 of the victims for an undisclosed amount.

Background

Building 
The   cement-block warehouse was constructed in 1930. The property was purchased in 1988 by Chor Ng, who is linked to 17 other properties in the San Francisco Bay Area. Ng also owned a body shop, cell phone store, and other businesses nearby. The auto body shop and the cell phone store shared the same electrical supply as the Ghost Ship. One resident who rented a space in the building during 2014 reported that the entire building's electrical system was dependent on extension cords. She was so uncomfortable with the safety issues that she slept in her car.

Ownership and management  
Chor Ng leased the property to Derick Almena  and Nicholas Bouchard in 2013. They stated in the lease agreement that the property would be used as an art collective "to build and create theatrical sets and offer workshops for community outreach". Almena named the building the Ghost Ship. He lived on the second floor with his wife and three children. He illegally sublet space on the first floor, charging about 25 resident artists between $300 and $600 a month rent. A one-bedroom apartment in Oakland at the time typically cost more than $2,000. 

Almena told members of the  artist collective who worked and lived there to tell people the warehouse was a 24-hour art studio, not that they lived there. In 2014 or 2015, Almena told Police Officer Hector Chavez that no one lived in the building, and he repeated the same statement several months before the fire to Police Officer Brian Kline. The collective was informally known by the tenants as Satya Yuga. A former tenant from 2016, Danielle Boudreaux,  said Almena used the tenants' rent to cover the warehouse rent, and used proceeds from the parties to pay his living expenses.

Makeshift spaces
Use of the warehouse building for housing and entertainment was illegal. Living spaces on the first floor were connected by makeshift hallways  constructed of "aggregates of salvaged and scavenged materials, such as pianos, organs, windows, wood benches, lumber, and innumerable other items stacked next to and on top of each other". The live-work spaces were separated by a variety of things, including "wooden studs, steel beams, doors, window frames, bed frames, railings, pianos, benches, chairs, intact motorhomes and trailers, portions of trailers, corrugated metal sheeting, tapestries, plywood, sculptures, tree stumps and tree limbs". 

Almena said that he, his wife, and his three children slept in the warehouse. Residents and others verified that he lived with his wife and children on the second floor and rented space to as many as 18 others who lived in recreational vehicles and makeshift rooms on the first floor. A person who had lived in the warehouse for a time described the building as "a whole maze to get through", filled with wooden objects. He said he left because it was "too sketchy to continue to stay there". One victim of the fire was a building resident.

Known problems

The city had received ten complaints about the property since 1998, including formal complaints about hazardous garbage and construction debris around the building. The Oakland Planning and Building Department opened an investigation into the building on November 13, 2016 based on a complaint about "blight" and "illegal interior construction". City building inspectors visited the warehouse on November 17, confirming the report of blight, but when no one answered the door, were unable to enter and investigate the report of illegal construction. 

Inspectors are required to obtain permission from owners to gain entry, and when that fails, must seek a court order. A spokesperson for the Planning and Building Department stated that promoters of events like the concert on December 2 are required to obtain a special permit, but none had been issued. The City of Oakland's planning director revealed that the building had not been inspected for three decades.

Although police and fire officials warned that the warehouse was a fire hazard, the Ghost Ship's founder, Derick Ion Almena, was reported to have ignored these concerns. The vice president of the local firefighters union said that the fire marshal's office had been understaffed for years and that a fire inspector upon seeing the conditions of the Ghost Ship "would have shut the place down". On December 13, the Oakland Fire Chief said "there were no indications this was an active business", that there are no city records showing her department had received complaints about the building and that the department "inspects businesses, not buildings".

Electrical problems 
Max Ohr, creative director of the artist collective, said the collective had reported electrical problems to the owner of the building. The East Bay Times reported on March 24, 2017, that the son of the building owner wrote an email about electrical problems to Derick Almena on February 15, 2015. The Times stated that Almena illegally sublet living space to other artists within the warehouse. They found emails showing that Almena had complained to the owner's son that electricity in the building used "ancient and violated lines of distribution" that were "in dire need of a total and immediate upgrade". The paper reported that an electrician who was currently unlicensed had performed repairs in 2014. He found ungrounded subpanels and "deferred maintenance dating back decades requiring immediate intervention". He reported to the owners that a single transformer meant for lighting was being used for three businesses in spaces owned by Chor Ng, exceeding its capacity. An attorney representing victims' families stated, "They were on notice that there was problems with the electricity".

In October 2018, the Ngs responded to civil lawsuit blaming the electrical issues on Benjamin Cannon, who subleased space from the auto body shop. It was revealed that Cannon had installed a new transformer, distribution panels, and breakers. After a transformer burned, Cannon wrote in a January 2015 email to Kai Ng, that he would install a "cheaper" transformer that "we are going to use it a little bit differently than standard". Cannon's electrical contractor's license expired in September 2010.

Fire 
On the night of December 2, Harris hosted an electronic music concert featuring performers from house music record label 100% Silk and other independent musicians. Between 80 and 100 people attended the event. Almena's wife and daughters went to a hotel so the girls could sleep.
 
Max Ohr, a jewelry-maker and resident, was doorman that night. When he saw the fire, he raced to his space, grabbing the biggest fire extinguisher he had. Anthony Perrault, who lived next to Ohr, grabbed his own fire extinguisher. With a third resident, they tried to put the fire out. But waves of fire exploded across the ceiling, igniting everything it touched. The three men dropped their extinguishers and ran toward the front, yelling "Fire!"

Carmen Brito was sleeping in her space in the back when the smell of smoke woke her. She had just enough time to put on a coat and shoes and run to the front door. Within another minute the lights failed. Nikki Kelber had a space near the front. She barely had time to grab her cat and fled with fireballs right behind her. Ryan O’Keefe later testified that within five seconds of seeing fire, the building "exploded into an inferno". He said the smoke was so intense that he and three others could only yell "Fire!" before escaping.

The fire spread extremely quickly and generated heavy, deadly smoke. Several factors prevented visitors on the second floor from learning of the fire and impeded their escape. Most importantly, there were no fire alarms, fire sprinklers, or smoke alarms in the building. Once the fire was detected, the stairwells and their position relative to exits, the makeshift construction, and the huge fuel load created by the furnishings made it difficult to survive long enough to escape.

There were two stairways, one in the back and an improvised one near the front. The rear stairway was concealed behind the stage and furnishings. The front stairway was made from a pile of stacked wooden pallets. A few people on the second floor were able to use the pile of pallets to escape. They had to crawl along the floor to avoid the dense smoke filling the building, and once on the first floor, struggled to find the front door because of the complicated layout and the many obstacles blocking the passages.

The building was cluttered with wooden furniture, pianos, art, and mannequins. Wooden doors and pallets were used to separate the many small living spaces. Oakland Fire Department Chief Teresa Deloach Reed told reporters, "It was like a maze almost."

The first firefighters, from Engine 13 whose station was one-and-a-half blocks away, reached the warehouse at 11:27 p.m., within three minutes of the first 911 call. Their only access was a single-person door that had been cut through a commercial steel roll-up door. One company pushed inside on their hands and knees, trying to stay under the smoke, with about 50 feet of hose. The "terrible" smoke conditions offered almost zero visibility, and they kept bumping into obstacles they couldn't see. They could only advance in a zig zag pattern about 20 feet (7 m) into the building. Another company pushed a second line in, but they too could only advance about 25 feet (8 m).

Chief James Bowron learned that up to 60 people might still be inside, but given the intensity of the fire and smoke, he believed any survivors would be found within their initial attack into the building. Concerned about losing nearby buildings, Bowron called a second alarm at 11:31 and a third alarm seven minutes after that.

The pallet stairway was initially reported as the building's only stairs. Authorities said once the pallet stairs caught fire,  it was instantly incinerated. Any party goers on the second floor who may have still been alive could not get down. No firefighter ever located the pallet staircase.  In any case, neither stairway led directly to one of the two exits.

About 22 minutes after the firefighter's arrival, the fire suddenly lit up the night sky. Four truck companies of firefighters were inside. They told Bowron that the second floor was already almost completely involved. Bowron feared for the safety of the firefighters. Due to the intensity of the fire and the danger of the second floor collapsing, Bowron ordered the firefighters to withdraw. They fought a "surround and drown" exterior defensive operation from that point forward. Seven minutes later the fire began "blowtorching" out the roof.

Most of the second floor collapsed soon afterward, and later on the wood-clad steel beam roof collapsed as well. It took 52 firefighters, using 14 pieces of apparatus, until 4:36 a.m. to declare the fire under control. The firefighters who had been on scene all night knew that dozens of people were missing. They were shaken up knowing they had not rescued a single person.

Recovery 
The next day the fire department search and rescue personnel began to stabilize the structure before they could search for victims. They deployed drone aircraft using thermal imaging that unsuccessfully searched for survivors. Due to the nature of the incident, investigators removed debris slowly and carefully, and it was three days before the last bodies were recovered. All but one of those killed were visitors to the warehouse. Seven victims were found on the remaining portion of the second floor, trapped by smoke and the missing stairway of wooden pallets that had burned. The other 29 victims were found on the first floor, one within feet of the side exit. Some of the victims were found huddled together, some unburned, under the collapsed second floor.

Fire origins 
An early report blamed the fire on a faulty refrigerator, but this cause was rejected by agents from the federal Bureau of Alcohol, Tobacco, Firearms and Explosives, although agents initially left open the possibility that it was started by another electrical appliance or component.

Investigators found "something screwed, welded, tacked, hammered or nailed to every square inch" of the building. According to Chief Bowron, "the fuel load inside was nothing short of incredible". The debris included wooden pallets, statues, piles of furniture, mobile homes, and mannequins.  Fire Department Operations Chief Mark Hoffman  described the first floor as a "labyrinth".

On June 19, 2017, the Oakland fire department, Bureau of Alcohol, Tobacco and Firearms, and the Alameda County Arson Task Force issued a 50-page report providing new details on the fire and subsequent recovery efforts. The report confirmed that all victims had died of smoke inhalation, the most common cause of fire fatalities, as previously reported. Investigators concluded that the fire began in the northwest area of the ground floor, and documented extensive damage to the electrical system, but were unable to pinpoint the precise cause due to the extent of the fire. The report also documents why it took days to remove the bodies after the blaze was out, as investigators were forced to slowly sift through the cluttered debris of the collapsed interior.

Legal aftermath

Criminal investigation 
A criminal investigation was launched by the Alameda County District Attorney's Office on December 4. An arson investigation was also launched. Oakland Mayor Libby Schaaf said charges against anyone found responsible could range from involuntary manslaughter to murder.

In public remarks on January 23, 2017, lawyers for Almena claimed that the fire originated in a building adjacent to the warehouse, and that Almena should not be held responsible. A report of the investigation published on February 8, 2017, stated that investigators were unable to find an origin, noting that the investigation was ongoing and that the electrical system was part of the analysis.

On March 14, 2017, Oakland Fire Department Chief Teresa Deloach Reed retired amidst questions about inspection procedures and management. The Alameda County lead prosecutor in charge of the investigation had been requesting the city fire department's report for several weeks when he finally received a copy on March 17. Its contents were not released to the public. On March 21, 2017, a judge ruled that debris from the fire must be preserved as potential evidence in pending lawsuits.

Prosecution 

On July 3, 2018, Almena and Harris each pled no contest to 36 counts of involuntary manslaughter. According to their agreement, Almena was to be sentenced to nine years in prison, and Harris to six. Some family members of those who died testified and protested the plea deal. Sentencing was set for August 9. But on August 10, 2018, the judge in the case threw out the plea deals, stating that Derick Almena failed to accept "full responsibility and remorse". The judge said that he would have accepted the plea deal for Harris because Harris showed remorse but the plea deal was made with both Almena and Harris.

During the preliminary hearings, building owner Chor Ng was questioned, but invoked her Fifth Amendment right to avoid testifying and the possibility of incriminating herself. Ng is among a number of parties that are being sued by victims' relatives. Witnesses described the Ghost Ship warehouse as a "death trap".

Almena and Harris individually faced the possibility of penalties ranging from probation to 36 years in prison if the prosecutor could prove criminal negligence and a unanimous jury found them guilty. Pending trial, Almena and Harris both remained in jail, unable to pay $750,000 in bail. Almena's attorney Tony Serra and Harris' attorney Curtis Briggs both said that much of their defense would involve diverting blame to others.

The trial began on April 2, 2019. Prosecution witnesses testified about the history of violations found over the years. Almena contradicted their statements, saying all of the city, police and fire officials were lying. During his testimony, he said a building inspector, a Child Protective Services agent, six members of the fire department, and three police officers had been to the building several times on social occasions and never mentioned any violations. Almena blamed the landlord for tricking him into renting a building that lacked adequate plumbing or electricity. 

Almena and Harris' attorneys claimed that the fire was arson. They called a witness who said she overheard a group of unidentified men at a taco truck claiming credit for starting the fire. Former Oakland Fire Marshal Maria Sabatini was called by the prosecution. She had been one of the principal fire investigators. She testified that although investigators believed the cause was probably an electrical failure, they could not determine the source because the fire destroyed possible indicators, and that there was no evidence of arson.

Katleen Bouchard, the mother of Nicholas Bouchard who co-signed the lease with Almena, testified that she helped her son with research and plans to develop the artist collective. She met with her son, Almena and his wife in 2013. She provided information on how they could obtain permits to upgrade the building and grants to help pay the cost. She said that Almena "laughed at me" and said he would do things his own way. Nicholas Bouchard became concerned about the modifications to the building that Almena made, including a  hole in the second floor, and distanced himself from the project.

Police officer Moises Palanco visited the building in 2015. On body cam footage played during the trial, he was heard saying, "It's a huge fireplace in here."

Prosecutors attempted to show that Almena failed to place smoke alarms, emergency exit signs, and fire suppression systems in the building while filling the space with art projects, furniture, sculptures, windows, doors, and salvaged and scavenged used items that made it difficult for the victims to find a way out. The prosecution showed that all of the victims died of smoke inhalation, not burns.

Almena was asked during his testimony if he had obtained legal permits for the kitchen he installed, for a side door, for the plumbing or electrical work, or the stairs in the front of the building. Almena said he had  "no permits for anything". He also said he didn't obtain operational permits for events because he didn't think they were required.

Harris testified that the title of Executive Director he sometimes used was inflated and an attempt to "add authority to his emails to landlords and event planners". But during his testimony, the prosecutor was able to show that Harris had a role in communicating about rent with the landlords, negotiated terms and evictions with other tenants, and was the primary contact for the group who presented the concert and party on the night of the blaze.

The jury convened on Wednesday July 31, 2019. On August 20, after 10 days of weighing the evidence, the judge replaced three of the jurors. The jury was required to restart deliberations. Two of the dismissed jurors could be charged with contempt for allegedly violating the judges' rules about reading or talking to the media about the case. On the same day, the judge also dismissed two motions by the defense for a mistrial. On September 4, 2019, the deliberations ended when the jury deadlocked 10-2 for conviction on the 36 counts of manslaughter charges pending against Almena, resulting in a mistrial. Harris was acquitted on all 36 counts. Harris was released from jail while Almena remained behind bars.

At a hearing on October 4, 2019, the judge set a new trial date for Almena in March 2020. A defense motion that his $750,000 bail be reduced was denied. Almena remained in jail. On January 31, 2020, the trial was scheduled to begin in May, with jury selection to begin in early April. The defense lawyers said the statute of limitations meant the warehouse owners could no longer be prosecuted, and they planned to call the Ng family as witnesses in Almena's next trial. 

On January 22, 2021, Derick Almena pleaded guilty to 36 charges of involuntary manslaughter (one for each person killed in the fire) as part of a plea deal under which he would serve between 9 and 12 years in prison. He was released on bail the previous May because of coronavirus concerns and posted a $150,000 bail bond.

On March 8, 2021, Almena was sentenced to 12 years in prison. With time served, he was expected to be able to serve his sentence in 18 months of home confinement while wearing an ankle monitor.

Civil lawsuits 
Numerous lawsuits related to the fire have been filed by 80 plaintiffs, naming '100% Silk', Pacific Gas and Electric Company, Ben Cannon, Derick Ion Almena, Max Harris, Chor Nar Siu Ng, the City of Oakland, Alameda County, and the State of California, and were subsequently consolidated. Plaintiff attorneys include Girardi & Keese, one of the firms which gained fame for taking on PG&E in the Hinkley, California, case that inspired the movie Erin Brockovich. 

While a cause for the fire was never determined, on December 17, 2019, U.S. Bankruptcy Judge Dennis Montali allowed the plaintiffs' case claiming that the fire was caused by an electrical malfunction to continue against PG&E, which, if successful, would receive money from PG&E's $900 million insurance money, but is not eligible to be part of the $13.5 billion allotted for the claims arising from the wildfires Butte Fire, Tubbs Fire, Camp Fire, and 2017 North Bay Fires.

When questioned during the preliminary hearing, the warehouse owner Chor Ng and her daughter and son all pleaded the Fifth Amendment to every question. Civil attorneys are waiting until after the criminal statute of limitations ends on December 2, 2019, three years since the fire, when they expect to get depositions from the Ngs.

In July 2020, the City of Oakland settled a civil lawsuit for the victims and agreed to pay a total of $33 million; $9 million to one person who survived with lifelong injuries, and $24 million to the families of the 36 who perished in the fire.

In August 2020, PG&E settled a civil lawsuit for 32 of the victims, out of the 36 who perished in the fire. The amount of the settlement was undisclosed, but it was limited to the amount available under PG&E’s insurance coverage for the year 2016.

Reactions

In an interview, Oakland City Council member Noel Gallo said that city officials "need to enforce the codes that we have" and that "we should have been more assertive in the past".

The Oakland Athletics baseball team offered to match donations for those affected, up to $30,000; the Oakland Raiders football team soon joined them. The Oakland-based Golden State Warriors basketball team announced a donation of $50,000 to the Fruitvale-based Unity Council. The Warriors announced an additional $75,000 donation to relief efforts on December 7, 2016. Warriors player Stephen Curry auctioned off two pairs of his shoes for $45,201 to benefit the Oakland Fire Relief fund. By December 9, 2016 the Gray Area Foundation for the Arts had raised over $550,000 and scheduled a benefit concert for December 14, 2016, featuring Bay Area musicians such as Primus, Tune-yards, and Boots Riley.

A Facebook Safety Check was deployed in early December 2016 to help people find the whereabouts of friends and family who might have been in attendance.

On December 3, 2016, the record label 100% Silk posted on their Facebook page: "What happened in Oakland is an unbelievable tragedy, a nightmare scenario. Britt and I are beside ourselves, utterly devastated. We are a very tight community of artists and we are all praying, sending love and condolences to everyone involved and their families."

Almena, who had not attended the party, posted a message on Facebook at around 1:30 a.m. for which he was soon criticized because he failed to mention the victims:

Almena later said that at the time of the post, he was unaware that people had been killed. In a brief interview on December 5, he spoke of the families of the victims, saying, "They're my children. They're my friends, they're my family, they're my loves, they're my future." In another interview on December 6, Almena said he was "incredibly sorry" and defended himself against charges of profit-seeking, saying, "This is not profit, this is loss. This is a mass grave."

On the night of December 5, 2016, hundreds of people attended vigils in Oakland and San Francisco in honor of the victims. Local residents, including artists and tenants' rights activists, have cited the fire as a symptom of the San Francisco Bay Area's underlying housing crisis. City inspectors have voiced suspicions that dozens of live-work warehouses similar to Ghost Ship exist in Oakland. On December 6, 2016, Mayor Libby Schaaf announced $1.7 million in grant funding to create affordable spaces for artists and arts organizations. She announced a planned revival and expansion of a task force on Artist Housing and Work Spaces, and the creation of a fire safety task force.

Comparisons were drawn between this fire and the 1990 Happy Land fire, a nightclub fire in New York City that claimed 87 lives. The Happy Land fire also involved controversial operations of the structure, and suffered from similar conditions including lack of emergency exits and poor maintenance.
In June 2017, local artist Chris Edwards built a boat sculpture in memory of Ghost Ship and installed it in the nearby Emeryville harbor. People have used it as a place to visit and leave flowers.

See also

 List of accidents and disasters by death toll
 List of disasters in the United States by death toll
 List of fires
 List of nightclub fires
 Denmark Place fire, 1980 London fire at illegally operated nightclub that killed 37
 Oakland Art Murmur
 25th Street Collective
 Onion (Shannon and the Clams album)

References

External links 

 Oakland Ghost Ship website, archived from the original on January 5, 2017.
Final list released of 36 victims of Ghost Ship fire in Oakland from the SF Gate, December 9, 2016
Vital Arts

2010s in Oakland, California
2016 disasters in the United States
2016 fires in the United States
2016 in California
Building and structure fires in the United States
Concert disasters
December 2016 events in the United States
Fires in California
History of Oakland, California
Nightclub fires
Warehouse fires